Calosoma reitteri is a species of ground beetle in the subfamily of Carabinae. It was described by Roeschke in 1897.

References

reitteri
Beetles described in 1897